The Silver Logie for Most Outstanding Sports Coverage is an award presented annually at the Australian TV Week Logie Awards. The award is given to recognise outstanding coverage of sports.

The first award for sports coverage was awarded at the 19th Annual TV Week Logie Awards ceremony, held in 1977 as Best Sporting Documentary. In 1978, the award became Outstanding Coverage Of A Sporting Event.  From 1981 it became Best Sports Coverage and in 1985 Best Coverage of Sport.

Logie Awards chosen by the public began in 1998, which included the Most Popular Sports Program until 2017.

SBS TV's The World Game won at least three Logies for coverage of the FIFA World Cup Les Murray and Craig Foster collected the TV Week Logie Award for Outstanding Sports Coverage in 2015, for their coverage on SBS TV's The World Game of the 2014 World Cup.

Winners and nominees

Best Sporting Documentary

Outstanding Coverage Of A Sporting Event

Outstanding Coverage of a Sports Report

Best Sports Coverage

Most Outstanding Achievement in Sports

Most Outstanding Achievement in Sports

Most Outstanding Sports Coverage

References

External links

Awards established in 1977

1977 establishments in Australia